Reanno Devon Gordon (born 24 January 1979), better known by his stage name Busy Signal, is a Jamaican dancehall reggae artist.

Biography
Reanno Devon Gordon p/k/a Busy Signal was born in Saint Ann Parish, living in areas in West and East Kingston such as Tivoli Gardens, Papine, and Spanish Town. He is a past student of Brown's Town Comprehensive High School. Known as one of the artists leading the contemporary dancehall movement, Busy Signal has been a large part of the scene since 2003, and released his debut single "Step Out" in 2005.  A music video for "Step Out" was released shortly afterwards.

He was nicknamed Busy Signal by his friends because he is constantly busy. His hit tracks for 2007/2008 were "Nah Go A Jail Again", "Smoke Some High Grade", "Tic Toc" and the track entitled "Unknown Number" has made tremendous airplay and dancehall reviews especially in the Caribbean and the US. He has released a hit dancehall album entitled Step Out.

On 22 September 2008, Busy Signal released his second studio album titled Loaded, a 15-track compilation on VP Records of well known dancehall hits such as "Jail", "Whine Pon Di Edge", "These Are the Days", among others, as well as never-heard-before exclusive tracks such as "People So Evil" and "Hustle Hard".

The artist announced the introduction of a self-styled clothing line in 2011.

On 21 May 2012, Gordon was arrested at the Norman Manley International Airport in Jamaica due to an extradition warrant from the United States. He was extradited to the US on 19 June where he faced cocaine-related charges. In September 2012 he received a six-month prison sentence. He was released in November, and promptly released the single "Come Shock Out". BBC Music ranked Reggae Music Again No. 7 on their Top 25 Albums of 2012 listing. Busy Signal appears on the No Doubt album, Push and Shove, collaborating with the band and the production team Major Lazer on the title track. He also appears on Major Lazer's second album Free the Universe, in the track "Watch Out For This (Bumaye)", which was a hit single in several European countries. In 2014, he made "Sports Day: Everyone Move", however, he pirated music off of Hatsune Miku's cover of the Internet sensation Ievan Polkka. His Parts of the Puzzle album was released on 4 October 2019 on VP Records. It entered the Billboard Reggae Albums chart at number 2.

Discography

Albums
2005: Step Out (Greensleeves) 
2008: Loaded (VP) 
2010: D.O.B. (VP)  – US Reggae no. 12
2012: Reggae Music Again (VP)  – US Reggae no. 5
2019: Parts of the Puzzle (VP)  – US Reggae no. 2

Singles

As a lead artist
2005: "Step Out Inna"
2008: "Tic Toc"
2010: "One More Night/Night Shift"
2011 : "Kingston Town" (feat. Damian "Jr. Gong" Marley)
2012: "Come Shock Out"
2013: "Why I Sing"
2013: "Danger Zone"
2014: "Professionally"
2014: "Sports Day: Everyone Move"
2014: "Money Flow" (feat. Eek-A-Mouse)

As a featured artist

References

External links

 
 
 
Busy Signal on Myspace

Jamaican dancehall musicians
Reggae fusion artists
Ragga musicians
1982 births
Living people
Jamaican people imprisoned abroad
Prisoners and detainees of the United States federal government
People extradited from Jamaica
People extradited to the United States
Jamaican drug traffickers
Jamaican reggae musicians
people from Saint Ann Parish
VP Records artists
Greensleeves Records artists